The 2011 Mini 7 Racing Club season consisted of thirteen rounds over seven events including a return to Spa-Francorchamps for the first time since 2006. Paul Thompson was the Mini Miglia defending champion  and Paul Spark the Mini Se7en defending champion.

2011 Calendar

Scoring system

Championship Standings

Dunlop Mini Miglia Championship

Dunlop Mini Se7en Championship

References

External links
Official website of the Mini 7 Racing Club
2011 photo gallery ''All photos taken by Oliver Read (Official Photographer of the Mini 7 Racing Club)

Mini 7